Calycobolus is a genus of flowering plants belonging to the family Convolvulaceae.

Its native range is Southern Tropical America, Western Africa to Angola.

Species:

Calycobolus acuminatus 
Calycobolus acutus 
Calycobolus africanus 
Calycobolus bampsianus 
Calycobolus cabrae 
Calycobolus campanulatus 
Calycobolus claessensii 
Calycobolus gilgianus 
Calycobolus glaber 
Calycobolus goodii 
Calycobolus hallianus 
Calycobolus heineanus 
Calycobolus heudelotii 
Calycobolus insignis 
Calycobolus kasaiensis 
Calycobolus lanulosus 
Calycobolus longiracemosus 
Calycobolus micranthus 
Calycobolus parviflorus 
Calycobolus petitianus 
Calycobolus racemosus 
Calycobolus robynsianus 
Calycobolus sericeus 
Calycobolus upembaensis 
Calycobolus zairensis

References

Convolvulaceae
Convolvulaceae genera